Expertos en Pinchazos is a 1979 Argentine sex comedy film directed by Hugo Sofovich.

Cast
Alberto Olmedo	... 	Alberto
Jorge Porcel	... 	Jorge
Moria Casán	... 	Fabiana
Tincho Zabala	... 	Don Antonio
Jorge Martínez
Patricia Dal
Reina Reech
César Bertrand
Jorgelina Aranda
Mónica Lander
Giselle Durcal
Alberto Irizar
Ricardo Morán
Juan Alberto Mateyko
Tina Francis

External links
 

1979 films
1970s Spanish-language films
1970s sex comedy films
Argentine sex comedy films
Films directed by Hugo Sofovich
Films shot in Buenos Aires
1979 comedy films
1970s Argentine films